Mauro Cioffi (born 16 May 1994) is an Italian footballer who plays for San Severo.

Career
In the summer of 2012, Cioffi moved from Crotone to Parma in a co-ownership deal. He then moved to Renate on a year-long loan deal. In the season 2013–14 he played on loan with Paganese.  In summer 2014 a new loan came, this time abroad, to Albanian Superliga side KF Vllaznia Shkodër. On 22 February 2015, he joined Montenegrin side FK Berane.

References

1994 births
Living people
Footballers from Rome
Italian footballers
F.C. Crotone players
Parma Calcio 1913 players
A.C. Renate players
Paganese Calcio 1926 players
KF Vllaznia Shkodër players
Kategoria Superiore players
Expatriate footballers in Albania
Italian expatriates in Albania
FK Berane players
Expatriate footballers in Montenegro
Association football forwards
A.S.D. Roccella players